Security Dialogue is a peer-reviewed academic journal that publishes scholarly articles which combine contemporary theoretical analysis with challenges to public policy across a wide-ranging field of security studies. The journal is owned by the Peace Research Institute Oslo which also hosts the editorial office. As of 1 October 2015 Mark B. Salter (University of Ottawa) is the editor-in-chief. Marit Moe-Pryce has been the managing editor of the journal since 2004. Current associate editors are Emily Gilbert (University of Toronto), Jairus V. Grove (University of Hawaiʻi at Mānoa), Jana Hönke (University of Bayreuth), Doerthe Rosenow (Oxford Brookes), Anna Stavrianakis (University of Sussex), and Maria Stern (University of Gothenburg).

Security Dialogue went through a significant change in scope under the editorship of J. Peter Burgess, and this has seen the journal climbing on international rankings to become one of the leading journals in critical security studies.  In addition to the flagship journal, Security Dialogue also runs a blog and podcast series.

History 
The journal was established by Marek Thee in 1970 under the name Bulletin of Peace Proposals. The aim was to systematically present, compare and discuss ideas, plans, and proposals for development, justice, and peace. The name of the journal was changed to Security Dialogue in September 1992.  In the editorial introduction to the new journal title, then-editor Magne Barthe called for inter-regional dialogue on security issues, and for an internationalization of both scope and dissemination. In celebration of the journal's 50th anniversary in 2019, a longer piece on the journal's history was written by Michael Murphy.

Critical Approaches to Security in Europe 
One of the most-cited articles published in Security Dialogue is the manifesto of the C.A.S.E. Collective, which outlined the recent history of critical security studies in Europe and suggested directions forward.  The C.A.S.E. Collective article traced the development of the different "schools" of European critical security studies from a sociological perspective, and was written by a group of junior and senior scholars, including: Claudia Aradau, Didier Bigo, Matti Jutila, Tara McCormack, Andrew Neal, Ole Wæver, and Michael C. Williams.  Then-editor J. Peter Burgess recognized the controversy caused by the C.A.S.E. Collective approach, and Security Dialogue published a series of replies to the C.A.S.E. Collective article by R. B. J. Walker, Andreas Behnke, Mark B. Salter, and Christine Sylvester in response to the manifesto, as well as a response to the critics written again by the C.A.S.E. Collective.

"Is Securitization Theory Racist?" Controversy
In August 2019, Alison Howell and Melanie Richter-Montpetit published the research article "Is Securitization Theory Racist? Civilizationism, Methodological Whiteness, and Antiblack Thought in the Copenhagen School", arguing that "Copenhagen School securitization theory is structured not only by Eurocentrism but also by civilizationism, methodological whiteness, and antiblack racism." Although they specified that their argument was "not a personal indictment of any particular author", they extensively addressed the works of Barry Buzan and Ole Wæver, two central figures of the Copenhagen School. Buzan and Wæver replied to the article in May 2020, citing alleged errors in the article and arguing that the methodology and academic standards of Howell and Richter-Montpetit's article are "so profoundly and systematically flawed as to void the authors’ argument", and thought that "the lack of credible supporting evidence makes their charge libellous."

List of Editors
Since 1970, 49 volumes of Security Dialogue have been published by 6 editors, totalling 214 issues. Below is a summary of the tenures of the respective editors.

Abstracting and Indexing 
The journal is abstracted and indexed in:

According to the Journal Citation Reports, the journal has a 2016 impact factor of 2.692, ranking it 6th out of 86 journals in the category "International Relations".

References

External links 
 
 Journal page at Peace Research Institute Oslo

International relations journals
Security studies
Bimonthly journals
Publications established in 1970
English-language journals